Vlad Tepes Dracula is a Swedish 1997 video game. In English the game is known as Dracula: Reign of Terror.

Plot 
Set in the 15th century, the player is Romanian general Vlad III whose goal is to recapture lands that were lost to the Turkish.

Gameplay 
The game is a micro-management kingdom simulator similar to Lords of the Realm.

Critical reception 
Game Side Story said the game would appeal to fans of the RTS genre, particularly fans of the game Risk.

References 

Adventure games
Video games developed in Sweden
Windows games
Windows-only games
1997 video games